Leslie James Orphan (17 April 1923 – 11 September 1995) was a Welsh amateur football inside forward who made one appearance in the Football League for Newport County. He was capped by Wales at amateur level.

References 

Welsh footballers
English Football League players
Wales amateur international footballers
Association football inside forwards
1923 births
Footballers from Newport, Wales
1995 deaths
Newport County A.F.C. players